The Stan Nagaiah Trophy is an annual series of one-day cricket matches played between Malaysia and Singapore. It has been played annually since 1995, and is named in honour of Stan Nagaiah, a cricketer from Singapore in the 1950s who also often represented All-Malaya. In 2016, a Twenty20 match was played as part of the series for the first time.

Results

Records

50 overs
Highest team score: 304-5 by Malaysia in 2014 
Lowest team score: 80 by Singapore in 1999
Highest individual score: 124 by Zubin Shroff for Singapore in 1999 and by Rakesh Madhavan for Malaysia in 1999
Best innings bowling: 5/13 by Jeevandran Nair for Malaysia in 1997

20 overs
Highest team score: 219-4 by Malaysia in 2016 
Lowest team score: 136-6 by Singapore in 2016
Highest individual score: 109* by Ahmed Faiz for Malaysia in 2016
Best innings bowling: 4/18 by Derek Duraisingam for Malaysia in 2016

References

Encyclopaedia of World Cricket by Roy Morgan, Sports Books Publishing

Cricket in Malaysia
Cricket in Singapore
International cricket competitions